Hodulcine (or hoduloside) are glycosides (dammarane-type triterpenes) which are isolated from the leaves of Hovenia dulcis Thunb. (Rhamnaceae) also known as Japanese Raisin Tree.
Several glycosides homologue have been found in this plant and although hoduloside 1 exhibits the highest anti-sweet activity, it is less potent than gymnemic acid 1.

See also 
 Gymnemic acid
 Lactisole
 Ziziphin

References

External links 
 Hovenia dulcis - Plants For A Future database report

Taste modifiers
Triterpene glycosides